The year 1632 in music involved some significant events.

Events 
December 29 – Just over halfway through a three-year contract as maestro di capella of Santa Maria Maggiore, Bergamo, Tarquinio Merula is dismissed for "indecency manifested towards several of his pupils."
Opening of the Teatro delle Quattro Fontane in Rome.
William Child becomes Master of the Choristers at St George's Chapel, Windsor.

Publications 
Melchior Franck
 (Hymn of Praise) for four voices (Coburg: Johann Forckel), a celebratory motet
 (Christian thanksgiving for our newborn baby Jesus) for seven and eight voices (Coburg: Johann Forckel), three Christmas motets
Giovanni Palazzotto e Tagliavia — First book of Messe brevi concertate a otto voci, Op. 10
Walter Porter – Madrigales and Ayres

Classical music

Opera 
Stefano Landi – Il Sant'Alessio (with libretto by Giulio Rospigliosi): Palazzo Barberini alle Quattro Fontane, 18 February 1632.

Births 
February 18 – Giovanni Battista Vitali, composer (died 1692)
April 2 (baptised) – Georg Caspar Wecker, organist and composer (died 1695)
November 28 – Jean-Baptiste Lully, composer (died 1687)

Deaths 
December 20 – Melchior Borchgrevinck, Danish musician, composer, and court Kapellmeister (born c.1570)

References